Joel Armia (born 31 May 1993) is a Finnish professional ice hockey right winger for the Montreal Canadiens of the National Hockey League (NHL). He originally played professionally in his native Finland with Porin Ässät of the SM-liiga. He was selected 16th overall in the 2011 NHL Entry Draft by the Buffalo Sabres.

Playing career

Finland

Armia spent three years in Finland, playing with Porin Ässät. During that time, he had career totals of 55 goals, 45 assists, for 100 points, with 120 penalty minutes. In 2012–13, Armia scored 19 goals and 14 assists in 47 games. He was instrumental in helping Ässät capture the SM-Liiga's Kanada-malja championship after finishing fourth in the regular season. In the playoffs, Armia scored three goals with five assists in 16 playoff games.

NHL

On 16 June 2012, Armia was signed to a three-year entry level contract with the Buffalo Sabres. During his second North American professional season in 2014–15, Armia was recalled from Buffalo's American Hockey League (AHL) affiliate, the Rochester Americans, and made his NHL debut with the Sabres against the Detroit Red Wings on 23 December 2014. He was then returned to the Americans before being traded on February 11, 2015, the Sabres sent Armia, alongside Tyler Myers, Drew Stafford, Brendan Lemieux and a conditional first-round draft pick in 2015 (Jack Roslovic), to the Winnipeg Jets in exchange for Evander Kane, Zach Bogosian and the rights to goaltender Jason Kasdorf.

On 30 June 2018, the Jets traded Armia, alongside Steve Mason, a seventh-round draft pick in 2019, and a fourth-round pick in 2020 to the Montreal Canadiens in exchange for Simon Bourque. On 13 July 2018, Armia signed a one-year contract worth $1.85-million with the Canadiens.

On 6 October 2018, Armia scored his first goal for Montreal, a shorthanded goal that gave the Canadiens a 4–0 lead over the Pittsburgh Penguins en route to a 5–1 victory. On 1 November 2018, Armia and Habs teammate Max Domi scored the fastest two goals by one team when Montreal defeated the Washington Capitals, 6–4. Domi scored at 19:38 of the third period, and Armia clinched the win with an empty net goal two seconds later. Armia converted the decisive goal in the fifth round of a shootout victory against the New York Islanders on 5 November 2018; he was the only player from either team to beat the goaltender. However, in the Canadiens' next game, against the New York Rangers on 6 November 2018, Armia suffered a knee injury. He was initially expected to miss six to eight weeks, and ultimately missed twenty-five games. On 3 January 2019, Armia returned from injury against the Vancouver Canucks; he was credited with an assist on Jordie Benn's opening goal in a 2-0 Montreal win. On 1 March 2019 Armia scored his first career NHL hat trick in a 4–2 victory against the New York Rangers.

On 11 July 2019, Armia signed a two-year contract worth $5.2 million with the Canadiens. He had previously filed for salary arbitration as a restricted free agent. Armia scored his first two goals of the 2019–20 season in a 5–4 overtime loss to the Buffalo Sabres on 9 October 2019.

After recording 7 goals and 7 assists during the 2020–21 regular season, Armia managed 5 goals and 3 assists during the Canadiens' deep run to the 2021 Stanley Cup Final. On 27 July 2021, Armia signed a four-year, $13.6 million contract extension with the Canadiens.

International play

As part of the Finland men's national junior team, Armia participated in the 2011, 2012 and 2013 World Junior Championships, scoring 11 goals and 9 assists across 19 games. The team's highest finish was fourth in 2012.

Following the 2021–22 NHL season, the Canadiens having failed the make the playoffs, Armia accepted an invitation to play for Team Finland at the senior level internationally for the first time at the 2022 IIHF World Championship, held on home soil. In his debut against Team Norway, he scored a goal and an assist in Finland's 5–0 victory. In his first nine games, Armia scored four goals and three assists, including the game-winning goal in Finland's semi-final victory over Team USA to reach the championship final. He scored his fifth goal of the tournament in Finland's 4–3 victory over Team Canada in the final, earning a gold medal.

Career statistics

Regular season and playoffs

International

References

External links 
 
 Joel Armia's player profile on Jatkoaika.com 

Living people
1993 births
Ässät players
Buffalo Sabres draft picks
Buffalo Sabres players
Finnish expatriate ice hockey players in Canada
Finnish expatriate ice hockey players in the United States
Finnish ice hockey right wingers
Manitoba Moose players
Montreal Canadiens players
National Hockey League first-round draft picks
Sportspeople from Pori
Rochester Americans players
St. John's IceCaps players
Winnipeg Jets players